Fighter Squadron 143 or VF-143 was an aviation unit of the United States Navy originally established as a Naval Reserve squadron VF-821 on 20 July 1950 it was redesignated VF-143 on 4 February 1953 and disestablished on 1 April 1958.

Operational history

The squadron lost 4 F4Us and 3 pilots killed during this deployment.

In June 1952 VF-821 now re-equipped with F9F-6 Cougars was again deployed to Korea on  under the command of Damon W. Cooper. The deployment ended on 6 February 1953 without the squadron losing any aircraft.

VF-143 was reactivated in June, 1962 at N.A.S. Miramar, and embarked aboard the USS Constellation, CVA-64 later that year. *Their squadron insignia changed to the 'Griffin' and they were called the 'Pukin Dogs'.

Home port assignments

Aircraft assignment
F4U-4 Corsair
F9F-6 Cougar
FJ-3M Fury
F4-B Phantom II
F-14A Tomcat

See also
History of the United States Navy
List of inactive United States Navy aircraft squadrons
List of United States Navy aircraft squadrons

References

External links

Strike fighter squadrons of the United States Navy